The Porsche 2708 is an open-wheel race car made by Porsche to compete in CART Indy car racing, between 1987 and 1990.

History

1987/1988: Porsche-Chassis
At the beginning of the 1988 season, Porsche took part in the U.S. CART series. The car was completely redesigned, the aluminum-plastic monocoque and the V8 engine developed by Hans Mezger were specially designed for this purpose. The latter was the main element of the vehicle. Methanol was used as fuel, a requirement of the CART regulations.

Al Holbert, who had won Le Mans three times in a Porsche 956 sports car and was fourth in the Indianapolis 500 in 1984, was a test driver but died in a plane crash in September 1988. Another driver was the 1987 Indy winner, Al Unser, who was 49 years old at the time. The Porsche-owned car was disappointed on both high-speed ovals and normal routes. In Indianapolis Teo Fabi and the green and white Quaker State/Porsche, March/Porsche Indy qualified 17th, but retired after 30 laps with problems with one bike.

One of the three vehicles built is on loan to the Cité de l'Automobile - Musée National - Collection Schlumpf in Mühlhausen, but belongs to the Porsche Museum in Zuffenhausen. One is now part of the permanent exhibition "Success story: Porsche Motorsport" in the EFA Museum for German automobile history in Amerang / Chiemgau.

1989/1990: March chassis
Most of the CART teams, apart from Penske Racing or AAR Eagle, did not build their own car, but bought a chassis, e.g., B. from Lola, and equipped it with engines from Chevrolet, Ford-Cosworth, Judd, or Buick. Porsche opted for March Engineering, manufacturer of the CART championship car from 1986 and 1987 and a five-time Indy winner with Cosworth engines. The 89 models were adapted to the Porsche engine and called the 89 P, which is why the vehicle ran as the March-Porsche 89 P until the end of its use in 1990. However, during that time, Chevy engines in Lola or Penske chassis were most successful.

Fabi qualified 13th in Indy in 1989, but retired after 23 laps with an engine failure.

In 1990 John Andretti came to the train, which at least started in tenth place. Both now blue cars supported by Foster's managed over two-thirds of the distance of approx. 800 km, but retired due to an accident and gearbox damage.

The involvement in the CART series was discontinued at the end of 1990 and, in retrospect, assessed as not very successful. Similar to the Formula 1 World Championship at the beginning of the 1960s, it was possible to point to a victory - that of Teo Fabi on September 3, 1989, at the Mid-Ohio Sports Car Course. However, Porsche soon started a monoposto project again with the naturally aspirated Footwork Porsche FA 12 in Formula 1.

A total of 15 copies of the Porsche 2708 and March-Porsche 89 P were produced. A blue number 4 is in Tübingen [4]

Specifications
Engine: Porsche turbocharged V8
Displacement: 2649,2 cm³ (161.7 in³)
Bore/Stroke: /
Torque: 
Compression ratio: 12.0:1
Valves: Two-valve per cylinder, DOHC, gear-driven
Cooling: Water-cooled, intercooler
Transmission: 6-speed manual transmission
Brakes: Disc brakes
Front suspension: Double wishbone
Rear suspension: Double wishbone
Chassis: Monocoque
Track width (front/rear): /
Wheelbase: 
Tires: Goodyear 9.5"/25"–15" (front), 14.5"/27"–15" (rear)
Dimensions (L * W * H): //
Weight: 
Top speed:

References

American Championship racing cars
2708
Porsche racing cars